Rear Admiral Koos Louw (born 17 July 1952) is a retired South African Navy officer.

He served as Flag Officer Commanding Naval Base Simon's Town twice, first from 1 April 1999 to 31 March 2005 and again from November 2006 to July 2012.

He also served as Chief of Fleet Staff at Fleet Command (2005) and Director Fleet Logistics.

Honours and awards 

 
 
 
 
 
 
 
 
 
 
 
  Grand OfficerOrder of Naval Merit (Brazil)
  Medal of Merit Santos Dumont (Brazil)
  Tamandaré Medal of Merit (Brazil)
  Officier Legion of Honour (France)
  Officer (Oficial - OIH) (Portugal)
In 2010 Louw was awarded the Order of Prince Henry by Portugal's ambassador to South Africa.

References 

South African admirals
Living people
Officers of the Order of Prince Henry
1952 births